Osku Nurmi is a Finnish radio personality. He wanted to be a musician or footballer when he was young, but started to host radio programs instead. He has been doing it since the beginning of the 1990s, for example in the local radio stations of Salo and Turku, before moving to Nelonen Media's Rock music station called Radio Rock.

Osku Nurmi has also worked as host in Miss Suomi pre-qualification of Salo.

External links
 Radio Rock - Osku Nurmi

Living people
Year of birth missing (living people)
Finnish radio presenters